The men's pole vault at the 2007 All-Africa Games was held on July 21.

Results

References
Results

Pole